Acrosorus is a genus of ferns in the family Polypodiaceae, subfamily Grammitidoideae, according to the Pteridophyte Phylogeny Group classification of 2016 (PPG I). It is known from the Philippines, Malesia, Thailand, and the Pacific islands.

Description
Members of the genus have radially symmetric (rather than flattened) rhizomes, covered with hairless scales of uniform color.

Their leaves may be partly cut, into lobes, or fully divided into pinnae. Their veins are at most a few times forked, and lack hydathodes. Each lobe or pinna of a fertile leaf bears a single sorus near the tip; the edges of the lobes or pinnae are rolled under and fused near the tip to protect the sorus. Leaf hairs may be single setae (bristles), single catenate hairs (consisting of chains of cells), or branched catenate hairs, with setae for branches.

Taxonomy
The genus was created by Edwin Copeland in 1906, to accommodate a group of ferns similar to Prosaptia and until then classified in Davallia.

Species
, the Checklist of Ferns and Lycophytes of the World accepted the following species:
Acrosorus friderici-et-pauli (Christ) Copel.
Acrosorus grammitidiphyllus (Copel.) Parris
Acrosorus pectinatus Parris
Acrosorus reineckei (Christ) Copel.
Acrosorus schlechteri Christ
Acrosorus sclerophyllus (Alderw.) Parris
Acrosorus streptophyllus (Baker) Copel.
Acrosorus subtriangularis (Alderw.) Parris
Acrosorus tenuis Parris
Acrosorus vallatus Parris

References

Polypodiaceae
Fern genera